Coxsackie virus B3 sensitivity is a protein that is encoded by the CXB3S gene in human beings. 

Its lineage is: Catarrhini, Chordata, Craniata,  Euarchontoglires, Eukaryota; Euteleostomi, Eutheri and others.

References